Ashes and Light is an album by Mark Heard, released in 1984 on Home Sweet Home Records. According to the liner notes, Heard recorded Mosaics first, but the record company wanted this album released first.

The cover reads, "This album is dedicated to the memory of Francis A. Schaeffer, whose love for truth and whose understanding of the arts has helped me more than I can say, in my desire to interweave the two."

Track listing 
All songs written by Mark Heard, except "Threw It Away" written by Mark Heard and Pat Terry.

Side one
 "The Winds Of Time" – 3:59
 "True Confessions" – 3:31
 "I Know What It's Like To Be Loved" – 3:38
 "Washed to the Sea" – 3:23
 "We Believe So Well" – 3:34

Side two
 "Straw Men" – 4:01
 "Age of the Broken Heart" – 4:16
 "Can't See Light" – 4:59
 "Threw It Away" – 4:06
 "In Spite of Himself" – 3:09

Personnel 
The band
 Mark Heard – acoustic guitars, electric 6- and 12-string guitars, slide guitars, synthesizer on "True Confessions", bass guitar on "Washed to the Sea" and "Threw It Away", harmonica, accordion, vocals, backing vocals
 Dave McSparran – drums
 Bill Batstone – bass guitar
 Carl Pickhardt – Hammond organ 
 David Mansfield – fiddle, dobro, lead guitar on "Age Of The Broken Heart" 
 Pat Terry – electric guitar on "Washed to the Sea", acoustic guitar on "Threw It Away"; synthesizer on "Straw Men", "We Believe So Well" and "In Spite of Himself", general camaraderie and comic relief
 Tom Howard – synthesizer on "Can't See Light", "I Know What It's Like To Be Loved" and "We Believe So Well" 
 Harry Stinson – percussion
 Dave de Coup-Crank – backing vocals
 Dori Howard – backing vocals

Production notes
 Mark Heard – producer, engineer, mixing at Fingerprint Recorders, Montrose, California, arranger, cover concept
 Dan Reed – assistant engineer on basic tracks
 Mylo Carter – punch-ins
 Janet Heard – punch-ins
 Pat Terry – punch-ins
 Tim Alderson – punch-ins
 Dave de Coup-Crank – punch-ins
 Stewart Ivester – cover photography, artwork, cover concept
 Tim Alderson – art director

References 

1984 albums
Mark Heard albums